The Faggots & Their Friends Between Revolutions is a 1977 fantasy novel written by Larry Mitchell, with illustrations by Ned Asta. The novel is drawn from Mitchell's experience of queer communal living in the 1970s, with particular emphasis on topics of sexual liberation and anti-assimilationism.

Synopsis
Described by Artforum as a "fairytale-cum-manifesto", The Faggots & Their Friends Between Revolutions is a series of allegorical vignettes set in the declining empire of Ramrod, ruled by "the men" (patriarchal society) under the rule of Warren-And-His-Fuckpole, while the eponymous "faggots" (gay men) live communally, produce art, have sex, and await the next revolution. Their "friends" include the "strong women" (feminists), the "queens" (drag queens), the "women who love women" (lesbians), and the "faeries" (the Radical Faeries), among others. Distinct from the faggots are the "queer men" – gay men who are closeted, or who have assimilated into patriarchal society. The novel is primarily non-narrative, and is composed largely of a combination of single-page episodes, polemic writing, and aphorisms.

Background and publication
Mitchell was inspired to write The Faggots & Their Friends Between Revolutions following a trip to The Castro in San Francisco in the early 1970s. He based the novel in part on his experience living in Lavender Hill, a queer commune in Ithaca, New York, that Mitchell and Asta were founding members of. Mitchell conceived of the book in reaction to a lack of contemporary gay literature; he initially planned for The Faggots & Their Friends Between Revolutions to be a children's picture book illustrated by Asta, but it would ultimately become a novel of prose and illustrations.

The novel was first published in 1977 by Calamus Press, founded by Mitchell to self-publish the book after being rejected by other publishers. The book subsequently went out of print, until it was republished twice in the 2010s: first in 2016 by Pocketed Books, and again in 2019 by Nightboat Books to mark the fiftieth anniversary of the Stonewall riots. The 2019 reissue features a new preface by Tourmaline, and an introduction by Morgan Bassichis.

Adaptations
In 2017, a three-part musical adaptation of The Faggots & Their Friends Between Revolutions was staged by Morgan Bassichis at The New Museum.

Reception and legacy
In the years subsequent to its release, The Faggots & Their Friends Between Revolutions has developed a cult following, having proliferated through the circulation of unofficial photocopied and PDF reproductions.

Reviewing the novel's 2019 reissue for Slate, critic John Russell comments on the novel's contemporary relevance, noting that "the descriptions of Ramrod's disintegration and the men's hostility toward the faggots and their friends are echoed in Trump's America." Regarding the novel's utopian philosophy, Russell writes that he is "of two minds," and expresses discomfort over "what seems to me like Mitchell's ultimate strategy of divestment from the world of the men."

In his review of The Faggots & Their Friends Between Revolutions for The Nation, Sam Huber expresses similar skepticism, writing that "when I catch myself trying to force into coherence this book's scattered proposals for another world, I entertain the possibility that I'm reading it wrong [...] It's too weird and protean to serve as a guidebook for ongoing queer struggles or to propel us reliably into a revolution to come." He nonetheless praises the novel's irreverence and continued relevance, stating that its similarities to contemporary politics are "like stumbling into a new room where many of the same actors and problems are reflected but with the fun restored."

References

External links
 The Faggots & Their Friends Between Revolutions at Nightboat Books
 The Faggots & Their Friends Between Revolutions at Google Books

1977 American novels
1977 fantasy novels
1970s LGBT novels
American fantasy novels
American LGBT novels
American novels adapted into plays
Calamus Books books
Novels with gay themes
LGBT speculative fiction novels
Radical Faeries
Self-published books
Utopian novels